The 2011 season in Swedish football, started in January 2011 and ended in December 2011.

Honours

Official titles

Competitions

Promotions, relegations and qualifications

Promotions

Relegations

International qualifications

Domestic results

2011 Allsvenskan

2011 Allsvenskan qualification play-off

2011 Superettan

2011 Superettan qualification play-off

2011 Division 1

Norra

Södra

2011 Svenska Cupen

Quarter-finals

Semi-finals

Final

2011 Supercupen 

Final

National team fixtures and results

Swedish clubs' performance in Europe
These are the results of the Swedish teams in European competitions during the 2011–12 season. (Swedish team score displayed first)

* For group games in Europa League, score in home game is displayed
** For group games in Europa League, score in away game is displayed

Notes

References 

 
Seasons in Swedish football